Arjun Kumar is a Nepalese music director, singer and film producer. His career started in 2008 as music director from film The Yug Dekhi Yug Samma and as a film producer from film Chapali Height.

Music albums
 Roje timilai
 Hridaya
 Passion
 Caliber (2007)

Filmography

References 

Living people
Nepalese musicians
Nepalese film producers
1970 births
People from Nuwakot District